Marie and Bruce is a 2004 American comedy drama film directed by Tom Cairns and starring Julianne Moore and Matthew Broderick. The story spans over one day of a couple's dysfunctional, strained relationship.
 
It was based on the 1978 play of the same name by Wallace Shawn, who also wrote the screenplay with Cairns, and premiered at the Sundance Film Festival on January 19, 2004. Although the film was well received and starred major motion picture stars, it failed to receive distribution.

It remained obscure until it was released on DVD in March 2009. The music was composed by Mark Degli Antoni, of the band Soul Coughing.

Plot
The story opens on a typewriter as it slowly flies out of a multi-storied apartment building window, shatters on the sidewalk and is collected by a garbage truck. Later, Marie explains it happened the previous evening when she lost her temper due to the noise of her writer husband Bruce's machine. 

Throughout the film Marie regularly breaks the fourth wall, narrating with hate-filled language, and speaking with Bruce with seething sarcasm. Seemingly oblivious, he continually uses terms of endearment hollowly.

Marie flashes back to yesterday after Bruce cried in her arms over the typewriter. At that moment she had decided to leave him. He seems oblivious to her heaping on of verbal invective and sarcastic, pejorative language. 

Bruce leaves for a lunch date with a male friend in which they both act strangely flirtaceously, as if the other is saying incredibly interesting things when they are quite mundane. However, they part stiffly. 

Marie is befriended by a Golden Retriever, who leads her through a door that magically takes her to a grassy field which she falls asleep on, which later is transformed into waves of the ocean that slowly envelop her. The retriever licks her awake and she heads to the party.

There, Marie is greeted by the host, afterwards mostly ignored. Bruce arrives, flitting between the other guests, making her jealous. He spends little time with her, preferring to be socialising. Marie gets tired, so he suggests she rest where she's sitting, she periodically dreams and wakes to the same mundane conversations.

In one dream, Bruce tells her about fantasizing about a young woman. Rather than acting upon the sexual urge she inspires, he rents a room and watches a woman across the way undress and then rest naked.

At the climactic dinner scene at a restaurant, Marie finally expresses her verbal contempt for Bruce but without much effect. They discuss their future together when Bruce surprises Marie with a gift he bought for the house.

Cast
 Julianne Moore as Marie
 Matthew Broderick as Bruce
 Bob Balaban as Roger
 Julie Hagerty as Party Guest at Frank's
 Campbell Scott as Tommy
 Griffin Dunne as Restaurant Guest

References

External links 
 
 
 

2004 films
American comedy-drama films
2004 comedy-drama films
American films based on plays
Films with screenplays by Wallace Shawn
2004 comedy films
2004 drama films
2000s English-language films
2000s American films